Black snakeroot may refer to:

Actaea racemosa/Cimicifuga racemosa, more commonly called black cohosh, an herbaceous perennial plant species native to eastern North America, with medicinal uses
 Certain species in the plant genus Sanicula